Paremhat 7 - Coptic Calendar - Paremhat 9

The eighth day of the Coptic month of Paremhat, the seventh month of the Coptic year. In common years, this day corresponds to March 4, of the Julian Calendar, and March 17, of the Gregorian Calendar. This day falls in the Coptic Season of Shemu, the season of the Harvest.

Commemorations

Apostles 

 The martyrdom of Saint Matthias the Apostle

Martyrs 

 The martyrdom of Saint Arianus, the Governor of Ansena

Saints 

 The departure of Pope Julian, the 11th Patriarch of the See of Saint Mark

References 

Days of the Coptic calendar